Hugo González may refer to:
Hugo González (Chilean footballer) (born 1963), Chilean former footballer
Hugo González (Mexican footballer) (born 1990), Mexican footballer
Hugo González (Paraguayan footballer) (born 1948), Paraguayan footballer
Hugo González (swimmer) (born 1999), Spanish swimmer